The 2019 Open Città della Disfida was a professional tennis tournament played on clay courts. It was the 20th edition of the tournament which was part of the 2019 ATP Challenger Tour. It took place in Barletta, Italy between 8 and 14 April 2019.

Singles main-draw entrants

Seeds

 1 Rankings are as of 1 April 2019.

Other entrants
The following players received wildcards into the singles main draw:
  Jacopo Berrettini
  Lorenzo Musetti
  Julian Ocleppo
  Giuseppe Tresca
  Giulio Zeppieri

The following players received entry into the singles main draw using their ITF World Tennis Ranking:
  Javier Barranco Cosano
  Peter Heller
  Karim-Mohamed Maamoun
  Skander Mansouri
  Denis Yevseyev

The following players received entry from the qualifying draw:
  Johannes Härteis
  Sumit Nagal

The following players received entry as lucky losers:
  Matteo Arnaldi
  Marco Bortolotti

Champions

Singles

  Gianluca Mager def.  Nikola Milojević 7–6(9–7), 5–7, 3–2 ret.

Doubles

 Denys Molchanov /  Igor Zelenay def.  Tomislav Brkić /  Tomislav Draganja 7–6(7–1), 6–4.

References

Open Città della Disfida
2019
2019 in Italian tennis
April 2019 sports events in Italy